Tim Schmoll (born 22 February 1993) is a Swiss former footballer who played as a defender.

Career

Early career
Raised in Switzerland, Schmoll played in Servette FC's academy from U16 to U18. After moving to the United States for college, Schmoll played soccer while at Harvard University, appearing in 61 games and tallying 10 goals. In 2015, Schmoll was a member of the New York Red Bulls U-23 team where he began playing center back and was named to the PDL All-Eastern Conference team.

Professional
On 26 January 2016, Schmoll signed a professional contract with the New York Red Bulls II. Schmoll featured in his first professional match with Red Bulls II in a 2–2 draw against Toronto FC II. On 19 June 2016, Schmoll scored his first goal as a professional helping New York to a 2–2 draw at Orlando City B.

Schmoll moved to Aldershot Town on 19 February 2018. He was released by Aldershot at the end of the 2017–18 season.

On 24 July 2018, Schmoll joined Dover Athletic on a free transfer.

Career statistics

Honors

Club
New York Red Bulls II
USL Cup (1): 2016

References

External links

1993 births
Living people
Association football defenders
Swiss men's footballers
Swiss expatriate footballers
Harvard Crimson men's soccer players
New York Athletic Club S.C. players
New York Red Bulls II players
Aldershot Town F.C. players
Dover Athletic F.C. players
USL Championship players
Cosmopolitan Soccer League players
National League (English football) players
Expatriate soccer players in the United States
Swiss expatriate sportspeople in the United States
Expatriate footballers in England
Swiss expatriate sportspeople in England